Anthony Applemore Mornington Bryer (31 October 1937 – 22 October 2016)  FSA FRHistS was a British historian of the Byzantine Empire and founder of the Centre for Byzantine, Ottoman and Modern Greek Studies at the University of Birmingham.

Biographical details 
Anthony Bryer was born on 31 October 1937 in Southsea, Portsmouth. He was the son of Group Captain Gerald Bryer and Joan Bryer (née Rigsby).  Part of his childhood was spent in Jerusalem and he was acquainted with Sir Steven Runciman, historian and Byzantine Scholar.  

In July 1961 he married Elizabeth Liscomb, who died in 1995.  In 1998 he married Jennifer A. Banks.

Bryer died on 22 October 2016.

Education and career
Bryer's post nominals include: Dip. (Sorbonne), MA, MA, DPhil (Oxford), FSA, FRHistS.

Bryer was educated at Canford School, and after completing his National Service he studied history at Balliol College, Oxford.  He initially remained at Balliol for his doctorate on the Empire of Trebizond, which he completed in 1967, but in 1964 he moved to the University of Birmingham where he created a programme in Byzantine studies.  In 1975 he founded the journal Byzantine and Modern Greek Studies. From 1976, he was the founding Director of the Centre for Byzantine Studies, and in 1980 he was appointed Professor of Byzantine Studies, a post which he held until 1999. In a distinguished career he has held fellowships at Athens University, Dumbarton Oaks and Merton College, Oxford.

Photography 
A number of photographs attributed to Bryer appear in the Conway Library at the Courtauld Institute of Art, London.  This collection includes architectural images, religious and secular, across many countries and is in the process of being digitised as part of the Courtauld Connects project.

Awards and honours 

Bryer was awarded an OBE in the 2009 New Year Honours for services to scholarship.

He was a Fellow of the Society of Antiquaries of London.

Publications 
Bryer's contribution to the study of the Byzantine world includes the following:
 The Empire of Trebizond and the Pontos, London: Variorum, 1988
 (with David Winfield) The Byzantine Monuments and Topography of the Pontos, Washington, DC: Dumbarton Oaks Research Library and Collections, 1985
 (with Heath W. Lowry) Continuity and Change in Late Byzantine and Early Ottoman Society, Birmingham: University of Birmingham, 1986
 Peoples and Settlement in Anatolia and the Caucasus, 800–1900, London: Variorum, 1988
 (editor, with Mary Cunningham), Mount Athos and Byzantine Monasticism: Papers from the 25th Symposium of Byzantine Studies, Birmingham, 1994
 (with Jane Isaac, David Winfield and Selina Ballance) The Post Byzantine Monuments at Pontos: A Source Book, Aldershot: Ashgate, 2002

References

External links 
 Centre for Byzantine, Ottoman and Modern Greek Studies

1937 births
2016 deaths
Academics of the University of Birmingham
Alumni of Balliol College, Oxford
British historians
British Byzantinists
Officers of the Order of the British Empire
People educated at Canford School
Scholars of Byzantine history
Travelers in Asia Minor